Cotyclytus lebasii is a species of beetle in the family Cerambycidae. It was described by Chevrolat in 1862.

References

Cotyclytus
Beetles described in 1862